The United States District Court for the Middle District of Tennessee (in case citations, M.D. Tenn.) is the federal trial court for most of Middle Tennessee.  Based at the Estes Kefauver Federal Building and United States Courthouse in Nashville, it was created in 1839 when Congress added a third district to the state.  Tennessee—along with Kentucky, Ohio, and Michigan—is located within the area covered by United States Court of Appeals for the Sixth Circuit, and appeals are taken to that court (except for patent claims and claims against the U.S. government under the Tucker Act, which are appealed to the Federal Circuit).

 the United States Attorney is Henry C. Leventis.

The Middle District has three divisions.
(1)  The Columbia Division comprises the counties of Giles, Hickman, Lawrence, Lewis, Marshall, Maury, and Wayne.
(2)  The Northeastern Division comprises the counties of Clay, Cumberland, DeKalb, Fentress, Jackson, Macon, Overton, Pickett, Putnam, Smith, and White.
(3)  The Nashville Division comprises the counties of Cannon, Cheatham, Davidson, Dickson, Houston, Humphreys, Montgomery, Robertson, Rutherford, Stewart, Sumner, Trousdale, Williamson, and Wilson.

History 
The judgeship was filled by President George Washington's appointment of John McNairy. Since Congress failed to assign the district to a circuit, the court had the jurisdiction of both a district court and a circuit court. Appeals from this one district court went directly to the United States Supreme Court.

On February 13, 1801, in the famous "Midnight Judges" Act of 1801, Congress abolished the U.S. district court in Tennessee, and expanded the number of circuits to six, provided for independent circuit court judgeships, and abolished the necessity of Supreme Court Justices riding the circuits. It was this legislation which created the grandfather of the present Sixth Circuit. The act provided for a "Sixth Circuit" comprising two districts in the State of Tennessee, one district in the State of Kentucky and one district, called the Ohio District, composed of the Ohio and Indiana territories (the latter including the present State of Michigan). The new Sixth Circuit Court was to be held at "Bairdstown" in the District of Kentucky, at Knoxville in the District of East Tennessee, at Nashville in the District of West Tennessee, and at Cincinnati in the District of Ohio. Unlike the other circuits which were provided with three circuit judges, the Sixth Circuit was to have only one circuit judge with district judges from Kentucky and Tennessee comprising the rest of the court. Any two judges constituted a quorum. New circuit judgeships were to be created as district judgeships in Kentucky and Tennessee became vacant.

The repeal of this Act restored the District on March 8, 1802, . The District was divided into the Eastern and Western Districts on April 29, 1802. On February 24, 1807, Congress again abolished the two districts and created the United States Circuit for the District of Tennessee. On March 3, 1837, Congress assigned the judicial district of Tennessee to the Eighth Circuit. Again, only one judgeship was allotted for all three districts. On July 15, 1862, Congress reassigned appellate jurisdiction to the Sixth Circuit. Finally, on June 14, 1878, Congress authorized a separate judgeship for the Western District of Tennessee, at which time President Rutherford B. Hayes appointed David M. Key as judge for the Eastern and Middle Districts of Tennessee. The first judge to serve only the Middle District of Tennessee was John J. Gore, appointed by Warren G. Harding.

Current judges 
:

Former judges

Chief judges

Succession of seats

See also 
 Courts of Tennessee
 List of current United States district judges
 List of United States federal courthouses in Tennessee

References

External links 
 United States District Court for the Middle District of Tennessee Official Website

Tennessee, Western District
1839 establishments in the United States
Tennessee law
Nashville, Tennessee
Courthouses in Tennessee
Courts and tribunals established in 1839